Alexander Robert Hirsch (born June 18, 1985) is an American animator, voice actor, writer, storyboard artist and producer. He is the creator of the Disney Channel series Gravity Falls, for which he provided the voices of Grunkle Stan, Soos, and Bill Cipher, among others. He also earned BAFTA and Annie Awards for the series. In 2016, Hirsch co-authored Gravity Falls: Journal 3 which debuted as a No. 1 New York Times Best Seller and remained on The New York Times Best Seller list for forty-seven weeks. In 2018, Hirsch wrote Gravity Falls: Lost Legends which also appeared on The New York Times Best Seller list.

Early life and education
Hirsch was born in Piedmont, California, on June 18, 1985. He has a twin sister named Ariel. His father is Jewish, and he was raised agnostic, celebrating Christmas and Hanukkah. Between the ages of 9 and 13, Hirsch and his twin sister would go stay with their great-aunt (or "graunty") Lois, at her cabin in the woods during the summer. These experiences later served as Hirsch's inspiration for Gravity Falls. He graduated from Piedmont High School where, as a junior, he won the school's annual Bird Calling Contest in 2002 and appeared on the Late Show with David Letterman.

Hirsch went on to attend the California Institute of the Arts (CalArts) where he created a variety of projects and short films including his senior film, Off The Wall, which combined animation and live action and "Cuddle Bee Hugs N'Such" with Adrian Molina, which was chosen by Nicktoons Network for their original series Shorts in a Bunch. He also spent the summer of 2006 working in Portland, Oregon on a later-scrapped animated film for Laika. He graduated in 2007 with a Bachelor of Fine Arts degree.

Career
Hirsch's first job after graduating from CalArts was as a writer and storyboard artist for The Marvelous Misadventures of Flapjack on Cartoon Network where he worked alongside fellow CalArts alumni, J. G. Quintel, Pendleton Ward (who was his writing partner on the show), and Patrick McHale. He would go on to develop the pilot for the Disney Channel series, Fish Hooks along with Maxwell Atoms and future Rick and Morty creator Justin Roiland.

In 2012, Hirsch created the series Gravity Falls for the Disney Channel. The show, set in the fictional town of Gravity Falls, Oregon, premiered in June 2012 with a voice cast including Jason Ritter, Kristen Schaal, and Hirsch himself. Over the course of the series, he provided the voices of Grunkle Stan, Soos, Old Man McGucket, Bill Cipher, and many other minor characters. The show was moved to Disney XD in 2014. It would go on to win a BAFTA Children's Award and an Annie Award in 2015 and was nominated for several other awards (including a Peabody Award in 2016). Hirsch ended Gravity Falls in February 2016 to pursue other projects.

In July 2016, Hirsch threw a global treasure hunt (known as "Cipher Hunt") for Gravity Falls fans with clues hidden throughout the world including in the United States, Japan, and Russia. The goal of the hunt was to find a statue of the Gravity Falls character, Bill Cipher. After two weeks, fans of the show discovered the statue in Reedsport, Oregon. The hunt coincided with the release of Hirsch's tie-in book, Gravity Falls: Journal 3, which was released on July 26, 2016 and eventually became a No. 1 New York Times Best Seller and appeared on The New York Times Best Seller list for nearly a year. A special edition of the book was released on June 13, 2017 and limited to 10,000 copies. The Gravity Falls: Journal 3 Special Edition contains blacklight writing, parchment pages, a monocle, removable photos and notes, and other features that were not included in the regular edition of the book.

In February 2018, Hirsch used his Twitter account to announce an official Gravity Falls graphic novel, through a series of puzzle pieces that he would release throughout the day. Put together the puzzle pieces revealed the cover of Gravity Falls: Lost Legends; 4 All-New Adventures! which was written by Hirsch was released on July 24, 2018 and also became a New York Times Best Seller.

Outside of Gravity Falls, Hirsch has done voice work for a number of projects including Phineas and Ferb, Rick and Morty, and as the announcer for the Chelsea Peretti special, One of the Greats. In August 2016, it was announced that Hirsch was in negotiations to co-write the live-action Pokémon film, Detective Pikachu, alongside Guardians of the Galaxy and Captain Marvel writer Nicole Perlman. Hirsch was a story contributor to Sony's animated Spider-Man film, Spider-Man: Into the Spider-Verse (2018).

On August 27, 2018, Hirsch signed a deal with American streaming company Netflix for a multi-year deal, according to Variety. Alex is currently in development on an unknown adult animated series for the company that remains NDA protected as of 2022 with no known release or announcement date as of yet.

Hirsch also co-executive produced the series Inside Job alongside creator and show-runner Shion Takeuchi. The first half of the first season premiered on October 22, 2021, with the second half releasing in November 18, 2022 with a second season being order on June 8, 2022. However on January 8, 2023, Takeuchi announced that the series was cancelled, which a representative from Netflix confirmed.

Hirsch is the voice of King, Hooty, and additional voices in the Disney Channel animated series The Owl House, created by Dana Terrace. The show premiered on January 10, 2020.

Personal life
Gravity Falls was inspired by Hirsch's own childhood experiences and his relationship with his own twin sister, Ariel Hirsch, growing up during their summer vacations. He placed many of his real-life experiences in the show, such as living in Piedmont and trick-or-treating with his sister as kids. Dipper Pines, one of the lead characters of Gravity Falls, is based on Hirsch's memory of how it felt to be a kid. When Hirsch was around Dipper's age, he attempted to teach himself backward speech by reversing recordings of his own voice. Hirsch described himself as "that neurotic kid who would carry 16 disposable cameras everywhere I went." The character Mabel Pines was inspired by Ariel. According to Hirsch, Ariel "really did wear wacky sweaters and have a different ridiculous crush, every week" in a similar fashion to Mabel. In the series Mabel acquires a pet pig, just like Ariel had always wanted when she was a child. The character of Grunkle Stan was inspired by Hirsch's grandfather Stan, who according to him "was a guy that told tall tales and would frequently mess with us to get a rise out of us."

From 2015 to sometime before April 2022, Hirsch was in a relationship with The Owl House creator Dana Terrace.
Hirsch was one of the few creative members to call out the negative aspects of The Walt Disney Company, with calling out the hypocrisy and poor handling of LGBTQ+ content across the company by either censoring or removing said content to appeal to conservative families and countries, lack of quality care and lack of the merchandise for Disney Television Animation productions from Disney Consumer Products and lack of the creative freedom with the creative members at Disney's multiple animation studios at the company.

In August 2020, Hirsch praised The Owl House for its nonheterosexual characters, stating that he had been prohibited from incorporating any explicit nonheterosexual elements into Gravity Falls.

In November 2020, Hirsch prank-called Rudy Giuliani's voter fraud hotline set up by the Donald Trump campaign, by using the voices of multiple Gravity Falls characters to report Hamburglar-esque ballot theft.

Filmography

Film

Television

Video games

Web

Bibliography

Nominations and awards

References

External links

1985 births
Living people
American male voice actors
Television producers from California
American television producers
American television writers
Animators from California
California Institute of the Arts alumni
American male television writers
People from Piedmont, California
Disney Television Animation people
Showrunners
American twins
Screenwriters from California
American storyboard artists
American cartoonists
Jewish American male actors
Jewish American artists
21st-century American Jews
Cartoon Network Studios people
Critics of Scientology
California Democrats